Pempeliella bayassensis is a species of snout moth. It is found in France and Switzerland.

References

Moths described in 2001
Phycitini
Moths of Europe